Digital audio cassette formats introduced to the professional audio and consumer markets:

Digital Audio Tape (or DAT) is the most well-known, and had some success as an audio storage format among professionals and "prosumers" before the prices of hard drive and solid-state flash memory-based digital recording devices dropped in the late 1990s. Hard-drive recording has mostly made DAT obsolete, as hard disk recorders offer more editing versatility than tape, and easier importation into digital audio workstations (DAWs) and non-linear video editing (NLE) systems.
Digital Compact Cassette was intended as a digital replacement for the mass-market analog cassette tape, but received very little attention or adaptation. Its failure is generally attributed to higher production costs than audio CDs, durability and lukewarm reception by consumers.

Digital videocassettes include:

 Betacam IMX (Sony)
 D-VHS (JVC)
 D1 (Sony)
 D2 (Sony)
 D3
 D5 HD
 Digital-S D9 (JVC)
 Digital Betacam (Sony)
 Digital8 (Sony)
 DV
 HDV
 ProHD (JVC)
 MiniDV
 MicroMV

Analog cassettes used as digital data storage:
Historically, the compact audio cassette which was originally designed for analog storage of music was used as an alternative to disk drives in the late 1970s and early 1980s to provide data storage for home computers.
The ADAT system uses Super VHS tapes to record 8 synchronized digital audiotracks at once.
There have also been several audio recording systems which used VHS video recorders as storage devices and video tape transports, generally by encoding the digital data to be recorded into an analog composite video signal (which resembles static) and then recording this to magnetic tape. These systems were generally used as "mixdown" recorders, to record the finished mix from a multi-track recorder in preparation for the manufacture of a vinyl record, cassette tape, or CD. An example was the Dbx Model 700.
Several companies sold VHS backup solutions in the 80s and 90s where data was converted to a video image which was then saved on a VHS tape.

References 

Audio storage
Computer storage tape media
Cassettes
History of television
Sound recording
Video storage